John Francis Hughes (11 May 1857 – 18 December 1912) was an Australian solicitor and politician.

Early years and background
He was born in Sydney to merchant John Hughes and Susan Sharkey. He was the elder brother of Sir Thomas Hughes. From 1870 he was educated at Stonyhurst College in Lancashire, and in 1876 he graduated from the University of London. He returned to Sydney and worked as a solicitor's clerk before his admission as a practising solicitor in 1884. On 2 July 1884 he married Mary Rose Gillhooley, with whom he had nine children. From 1887 he partnered with his brother, and he was also a landowner.

Political career
From 1891 to 1894 he was a Sydney City alderman for Fitzroy Ward.

In 1895 he was appointed to the New South Wales Legislative Council. He was a member of the Reid ministry, serving as Vice-President of the Executive Council and Representative of the Government in the Legislative Council from November 1898 to September 1899. He briefly served as Minister of Justice from July to September 1899. He was also a member of the Carruthers ministry and its successor, the Wade ministry, again serving as Vice-President of the Executive Council and Representative of the Government in the Legislative Council from August 1904 to October 1910.

Later life and legacy

He was the father of rugby union players James Hughes (1886–1943) and Bryan Desmond Hughes (1888–1918; killed in the First World War).

Honours
He was created Knight Commander of St Gregory by Pope Leo XIII in 1903.

References

 

1857 births
1912 deaths
Members of the New South Wales Legislative Council
Knights Commander of the Order of St Gregory the Great